Exile to Siberia (Polish: Na Sybir) is a Polish historical film directed by Henryk Szaro and starring Adam Brodzisz, Jadwiga Smosarska and Mieczysław Frenkiel. It was released in 1930. The film's art direction was by Józef Galewski and Jacek Rotmil. The film was originally silent, but a soundtrack was added in a Berlin studio.

Synopsis
During the Revolution of 1905, a young Polish revolutionary is arrested in Warsaw and set to Siberia by the Russian authorities. His girlfriend travels out and helps him escape.

Main cast
 Adam Brodzisz as Ryszard Prawdzic aka Sęp ('Vulture') 
 Jadwiga Smosarska as Rena Czarska 
 Mieczysław Frenkiel as Józef Czarski, Rena's father 
 Bogusław Samborski as Police Col. Sierow 
 Mira Zimińska as Janka Mirska 
 Maria Chaveau as Charwoman 
 Eugeniusz Bodo as Worker 
 Kazimierz Justian as Spy
 Jan Belina

Bibliography
 Skaff, Sheila. The Law of the Looking Glass: Cinema in Poland, 1896-1939. Ohio University Press, 2008.

References

External links
 

1930 films
1930 drama films
1930s romance films
Polish drama films
Polish historical films
Polish romance films
1930s Polish-language films
Polish black-and-white films
Films set in Warsaw
Films about the 1905 Russian Revolution
Films directed by Henryk Szaro
Transitional sound films
Films set in Siberia